Siaha Burley (born July 16, 1977) is an American former arena football wide receiver and former head coach. He played college football at UCF and was also the head coach of the Jacksonville Sharks from 2017 to 2019 before returning to the team for 2022.

High school years
Burley attended Westwood High School in Mesa and was a letterman in football, basketball, and track. In football, as a senior, he was an All-City and an All-State selection as a wide receiver and as a defensive back.

College career
Before Burley transferred from Mesa Community College to the University of Central Florida where he played football, he played in the Arizona Football League. While at UCF, he led the team in receiving for two straight years. He also led the team in punt returns. His college quarterback was National Football League quarterback Daunte Culpepper.

Professional career
In 2001 and 2002, Burley spent his first two AFL seasons with the Orlando Predators. Following the 2001 season, he was named to the AFL All-Rookie team. In 2003, Burley played just one season for the Los Angeles Avengers recording nine touchdowns. In 2004 and 2005, Burley played for the Arizona Rattlers for two seasons. In 2005, the Arena Football League's Writers Association named Burley the Offensive Player of the Year. He set a franchise record with 45 touchdown receptions for the season and was named to the All-Arena Second Team. In 2006, Burley played for the Utah Blaze where he started all 16 games. He ended the season ranked first in the league with an average of 120.9 receiving yards per game and second in the league for touchdown catches (44) and average receptions per game (8.5). He set expansion team records in total receiving yards (1,934), receptions (136) and receiving touchdowns (44). He was also named to the All-Arena Second Team for the second consecutive year. In 2007, Burley had a record-setting year with the Blaze, breaking league records for receptions (166) and receiving yards (2,129) and was named Offensive Player of the Year for the second time in his career. He also finished second in the league with 49 touchdown receptions and averaged 12.8 yards per catch. He averaged 24.6 yards on kickoff returns. In 2008, he recorded 114 receptions for 1,386 yards, and 33 touchdowns. He also carried the ball once for a loss of eight yards. On defense, he recorded two tackles and returned one kickoff three yards. After the season, on November 10, 2008, he was released by the Rattlers.

Coaching career
Burley became the wide receivers coach for the Arizona Rattlers in 2011 under head coach Kevin Guy. In 2013, Burley was named the offensive coordinator for the Chicago Rush. In 2014, Burley was named the offensive coordinator for the Orlando Predators. After two seasons with the Predators, Burley was named the offensive coordinator for the Rattlers on December 2, 2015. After the Rattlers left the AFL for the Indoor Football League, Burley joined the Cleveland Gladiators in the same position for the 2017 season.

On May 23, 2017, Burley left the Gladiators early in the 2017 season to become the head coach of the Jacksonville Sharks, a team that had left the AFL to start the new National Arena League. He won two championships with the Sharks before leaving the team after the 2019 season when they could not come to terms on a contract extension. He was re-hired by the Sharks as head coach for the 2022 season.

Personal life
. The couple have three daughters, Sia Jonet N’lae, and Saniyah .
He has three brothers, Solomon, LaRue and Nigel.

Notes

External links

 Arizona Rattlers profile
 Stats at ArenaFan
 

1977 births
Living people
Sportspeople from Mesa, Arizona
American football wide receivers
UCF Knights football players
Orlando Predators players
Los Angeles Avengers players
Arizona Rattlers players
Utah Blaze players
Orlando Predators coaches
Arizona Rattlers coaches
Chicago Rush coaches
Mesa Thunderbirds football players
Cleveland Gladiators coaches
Jacksonville Sharks coaches